This is a list of bridges and viaducts in Sweden, including those for pedestrians and vehicular traffic.

Major road and railway bridges 
This table presents the structures with spans greater than 100 meters (non-exhaustive list).

List of longest bridges in Sweden

Notes and references 
 

 Others references

See also 

 List of bridges in Stockholm
 :sv:Lista över öppningsbara broar i Sverige  - List of moveable bridges in Sweden
 Transport in Sweden
 Rail transport in Sweden
 List of motorways in Sweden
 Geography of Sweden

External links

Further reading 
 
 

Sweden
 
Bridges
Bridges